Ralph Anthony MacDonald (March 15, 1944 – December 18, 2011) was a Trinbagonian-American percussionist, songwriter, musical arranger, record producer, steelpan virtuoso and philanthropist.

His compositions include "Where Is the Love", a Grammy Award winner for the duet of Roberta Flack and Donny Hathaway; "Just the Two of Us", recorded by Bill Withers and Grover Washington Jr.; and "Mister Magic" recorded by Grover Washington Jr.

Career

Growing up in Harlem, New York, United States, under the close mentorship of his Trinbagonian father, Patrick MacDonald (a calypsonian and bandleader originally from Trinidad and Tobago who used the stage name "Macbeth the Great"), MacDonald began showing his musical talent, particularly with the steelpan, and when he was 17 years old started playing pan for the Harry Belafonte show.

He remained with the Belafonte band for a decade before deciding to strike out on his own. In 1967, together with Bill Eaton and William Salter, he formed Antisia Music Incorporated. Antisia is based in Stamford, Connecticut.

In 1971, Roberta Flack recorded "Where Is the Love", which MacDonald and Salter had written. The duet with Donny Hathaway won a Grammy Award for Best Pop Performance by a Duo or Group with Vocal. The single was awarded gold status and sold more than one million copies. MacDonald played on the session for the song.

One of MacDonald's best-known co-compositions is "Just the Two of Us", a single sung by Bill Withers, with saxophone performance by Grover Washington, Jr. It reached number two on the Billboard Hot 100, and has since been covered and sampled by many artists, including Will Smith.

As a solo recording artist, MacDonald scored a massive disco hit with “Calypso Breakdown”, recorded for the TK Records imprint, Marlin Records. It was also featured on the Saturday Night Fever soundtrack.

Later life
MacDonald regularly travelled back to Trinidad and Tobago, where he renewed his work in the steelpan, particularly on the hills of Laventille, Trinidad with the multiple Steelband Panorama champions Desperadoes Steel Orchestra, whose shows he attended and with whom he played whenever he got the opportunity, "beating iron" in "The Engine Room" (as a steelband's rhythm section is often called). Calypso and the steelpan were Ralph MacDonald's roots. He recorded a song called "You Need More Calypso", written by William Eaton to articulate how he felt the music world could more benefit by the genre his homeland had given to the world.

On December 18, 2011, MacDonald died of lung cancer. His wife, Grace, and four children Jovonni, Anthony, Atiba and Nefra-Ann survive him.

Discography
His recording credits number in the hundreds and include Burt Bacharach, George Benson, David Bowie, Aretha Franklin, Art Garfunkel, Billy Joel, Quincy Jones, Carole King, Miriam Makeba, David Sanborn, Paul Simon, Steely Dan, James Taylor, Luther Vandross, Amy Winehouse, Bob James, Ashford and Simpson, Nana Mouskouri, The Average White Band, Hall & Oates, The Brothers Johnson, and spent years as a charter member of Jimmy Buffett's Coral Reefer Band.

He is also featured on percussion on George Benson's 1976 album, Breezin'; on percussion on Carole King's 1975 album, Thoroughbred, and on Looking Glass's 1973 album Subway Serenade.

His song "Jam on the Groove" was featured on the breakbeat compilation Ultimate Breaks and Beats. His "Calypso Breakdown" is on the Saturday Night Fever soundtrack. He provided the percussion to "Mister Magic" recorded by saxophonist Grover Washington, Jr.

MacDonald also appears on Amy Lee's CD Use Me.

As leader
Sound of a Drum (Marlin, 1976)
The Path (Marlin, 1978)
Counterpoint (Marlin, 1979)
Universal Rhythm (Polydor, 1984)
Surprize (Polydor, 1985)
Port Pleasure (1998)
Trippin (2000)
Home Grown (2003)
Just the Two of Us (2004)
Mixty Motions (2008)

As sidemanWith Peter AllenContinental American (A&M, 1974)With Patti AustinEnd of a Rainbow (CTI, 1976)
Havana Candy (CTI, 1977)
Every Home Should Have One (Qwest, 1981)
In My Life (CTI Records, 1983)
Gettin' Away With Murder (Qwest, 1985)With Gato Barbieri Caliente, (A&M Records, 1976, 1986, CD 3247)With George BensonBreezin' (Warner Bros., 1976)
In Flight (Warner Bros., 1977)
Weekend in L.A. (Warner Bros., 1978)
Livin' Inside Your Love (Warner Bros., 1979)
20/20 (Warner Bros., 1985)
Big Boss Band (Warner Bros., 1990)
That's Right (GRP, 1996)With David BowieYoung Americans (RCA Records, 1975)With Martin BrileyDangerous Moments (Mercury Records, 1984)With Jimmy Buffett Take the Weather With You (RCA Records, 2006, 88697-00332-2)With Kenny Burrell and Grover Washington Jr.Togethering (Blue Note, 1984)With Ron CarterBlues Farm (CTI, 1973)
Spanish Blue (CTI, 1974)
Anything Goes (Kudu, 1975)
A Song for You (Milestone, 1978)
Pick 'Em (Milestone, 1978 [1980])
New York Slick (Milestone, 1979)
Empire Jazz (RSO, 1980)With Merry ClaytonKeep Your Eye on the Sparrow (Ode, 1975)With Judy CollinsJudith (Elektra, 1975)With Randy CrawfordEverything Must Change (Warner Bros., 1976)With Jackie DeShannonYour Baby Is a Lady (Atlantic, 1974)With Paul DesmondSkylark (CTI, 1973)With Yvonne EllimanYvonne Elliman (Decca, 1972)With Little FeatJoin the Band (429 Records, 2008)With Roberta FlackQuiet Fire (Atlantic, 1971)
Killing Me Softly (Atlantic, 1973)
Feel Like Makin' Love (Atlantic, 1975)
I'm the One (Atlantic, 1982)With Roberta Flack and Donny HathawayRoberta Flack & Donny Hathaway (Atlantic, 1972)With Aretha FranklinLet Me in Your Life (Atlantic, 1974)
With Everything I Feel in Me (Atlantic, 1974)With Michael FranksBurchfield Nines (Warner Bros., 1978)
The Camera Never Lies (Warner Bros., 1987)With Glenn FreySoul Searchin' (MCA Records, 1988)With Art GarfunkelBreakaway (Columbia Records, 1975)
Watermark (Columbia Records, 1977)With Bee GeesLiving Eyes (RSO, 1981)
Still Waters (Polydor, 1997)With Barry GoldbergBarry Goldberg (Atco Records, 1974)With Lesley GoreLove Me By Name (A&M, 1976)With Hall & OatesAbandoned Luncheonette (Atlantic, 1973)With Tim HardinBird on a Wire (Columbia, 1971)With Donny Hathaway Extension of a Man (Atco, 1973)With Bob JamesOne (CTI, 1974)
Two (CTI, 1975)
Three (CTI, 1976)
BJ4 (CTI, 1977)
Heads (CTI, 1977)
Touchdown (Tappan Zee Records, 1978)
Lucky Seven (Tappan Zee Records, 1979)With Bob James and Earl KlughOne on One (Tappan Zee Records, 1979)With Milt JacksonSunflower (CTI, 1972)With Al JarreauGlow (Reprise, 1976)With Garland JeffreysGarland Jeffreys (Atlantic, 1973)
One-Eyed Jack (A&M, 1978)With Billy JoelThe Stranger (Columbia, 1977)
52nd Street (Columbia, 1978)
An Innocent Man (Columbia, 1983)With Margie JosephMargie Joseph (Atlantic, 1973)
Sweet Surrender (Atlantic, 1974)
Margie (Atlantic, 1975)With Carole KingThoroughbred (A&M Records, 1976)With Hubert LawsMorning Star (CTI, 1972)
The Chicago Theme (CTI, 1974)With Julian LennonValotte (Atlantic Records, 1984)With O'Donel LevyEverything I Do Gonna Be Funky (Groove Merchant, 1974)With Kenny LogginsCelebrate Me Home (Columbia Records, 1977)With Elliot LurieElliot Lurie (Epic Records, 1975)With Taj MahalTaj (Gramavision, 1987)With Junior ManceThat Lovin' Feelin' (Milestone, 1972)With Arif MardinJourney (Atlantic, 1974)With Don McLeanPlayin' Favorites (United Artists Records, 1973)
Homeless Brother (United Artists Records, 1974)With Bette MidlerThe Divine Miss M (Atlantic Records, 1972)
Bette Midler (Atlantic Records, 1973)With Melba MoorePeach Melba (Buddah Records, 1975)With The Neville BrothersFiyo on the Bayou (A&M, 1981)With David "Fathead" NewmanMr. Fathead (Warner Bros., 1976)With Laura NyroChristmas and the Beads of Sweat (Columbia Records, 1970)With Teddy PendergrassTP (Philadelphia, 1980)
This One's for You (Philadelphia, 1982)With Esther PhillipsAlone Again, Naturally (Kudu, 1972)
Performance (Kudu, 1974)
Capricorn Princess (Kudu, 1976)
What a Diff'rence a Day Makes (Kudu, 1976)
For All We Know (Kudu, 1976)With John PrineSweet Revenge (Atlantic Records, 1973)With Bernard PurdieSoul Is... Pretty Purdie (Flying Dutchman, 1972)With Bonnie RaittStreetlights (Warner Bros. Records, 1974)With Martha ReevesMartha Reeves (MCA Records, 1974)With Lionel RichieTuskegee (Mercury Records, 2012)With Max RoachLift Every Voice and Sing (Atlantic, 1971)With Diana RossWhy Do Fools Fall in Love (RCA Records, 1981)With David SanbornTaking Off (Warner Bros., 1975)
Heart to Heart (Warner Bros., 1978)
Hideaway (Warner Bros., 1979)
Voyeur (Warner Bros., 1980)With Shirley ScottSomething (Atlantic, 1970)With Don SebeskyGiant Box (CTI, 1973)With Janis SiegelExperiment in White (Atlantic Records, 1982)With Carly SimonHotcakes (Elektra, 1974)With Paul SimonStill Crazy After All These Years (Columbia Records, 1975)
Graceland (Warner Bros. Records, 1986)With Phoebe SnowPhoebe Snow (Shelter, 1974)
It Looks Like Snow (Columbia, 1976)
Second Childhood (Columbia Records, 1976)
Never Letting Go (Columbia Records, 1977)
Against the Grain (Columbia Records, 1978)With Steely DanGaucho (MCA, 1980)With Gábor SzabóMizrab (CTI, 1972)
Macho (Salvation, 1975)With James TaylorWalking Man (Warner Bros., 1974)With The Manhattan TransferComing Out (Atlantic, 1976)With Kenny VanceVance 32 (Atlantic, 1975)With Grover Washington Jr.All the King's Horses (Kudu, 1972)
Soul Box (Kudu, 1973)
Mister Magic (Kudu, 1975)
A Secret Place (Kudu, 1976)
Skylarkin' (Motown, 1980)
Winelight (Elektra, 1980)
Come Morning (Elektra, 1981)
Inside Moves (Elektra, 1984)With Bill Withers'''Making Music (Columbia, 1975)Menagerie (Columbia, 1977)'Bout Love (Columbia, 1978)Watching You, Watching Me'' (Columbia, 1985)

References

External links
Ralph MacDonald Official Website

Ralph MacDonald Interview NAMM Oral History Library (2008)

1944 births
2011 deaths
American jazz percussionists
Songwriters from New York (state)
African-American songwriters
People from Harlem
Musicians from New York City
Grammy Award winners
American session musicians
Deaths from lung cancer
American rock percussionists
Deaths from cancer in Connecticut
Steelpan musicians
Conga players
Bongo players
Tambourine players
Maracas players
Triangle players
Timbaleros
Güiro players
Castanets players
Coral Reefer Band members
Jazz musicians from New York (state)
20th-century African-American people
21st-century African-American people